The Athens Area School District is a mid-sized, rural, public school district which serves the Borough of Athens and Ridgebury Township, Athens Township, Smithfield Township, Ulster Township and Sheshequin Township in Bradford County, Pennsylvania. Per 2000 federal census data, the district serves a resident population of 15,533.

Extracurriculars
The district offers a variety of clubs, activities and an extensive sports program.

Sports
The District funds the following varsity sports:

Boys
Baseball – AA
Basketball – AAA
Cross Country – AA
Football – AA
Golf – AA
Soccer – AA
Swimming and Diving – AA
Track and Field – AA
Wrestling	 – AA

Girls
Basketball – AAA
Cross Country – AA
Golf	 – AA
Soccer (Fall) – AA
Softball – AAA
Swimming and Diving – AA
Track and Field – AAA
Volleyball – AA

According to PIAA directory July 2012 

A typical cafeteria menu offering at Athens Area Schools could be: chicken nuggets with a bread slice, ham and cheese quesadilla, steamed peas, applesauce, and milk.

References

School districts in Bradford County, Pennsylvania